Magude is a town in Maputo Province in southern Mozambique. It is the seat of Magude District.

History 
On 27 March 1974, the Magude train disaster, in which a passenger train collided head-on with a freight train carrying petroleum products, caused 70 deaths and 200 injuries.

Transport
The town lies on a railway junction on the southern system.

See also
 Transport in Mozambique

Resources on Magude

Populated places in Maputo Province